Simonyi is a surname of Hungarian origin, and may refer to the following prominent figures who bear that name:

 András Simonyi, Hungarian ambassador to the United States
 André Simonyi, Hungarian-French former football player
 Charles Simonyi, software developer and space tourist
 Simonyi Professorship for the Public Understanding of Science, a chair at Oxford endowed by Charles Simonyi
 Károly Simonyi, Hungarian professor of electrical engineering and writer and father of Charles Simonyi
 Baron Lajos Simonyi, Hungarian politician
 Sándor Simonyi-Semadam, Hungarian politician and lawyer, Prime Minister of Hungary (1920)

See also 

 related surname: Abner Shimony, American physicist and philosopher of science
 Simony (disambiguation)

Hungarian-language surnames